Jacob Louis Hazel (born 15 April 1994)  is a Saint Kitts and Nevis international footballer who plays as a striker for  club Darlington.

Career

Chesterfield
Hazel came through the youth system at Chesterfield, where he turned professional in 2012. He made his professional debut on 4 September 2012, in a 2–1 win at home to Oldham Athletic in the Football League Trophy, replacing Scott Boden in the 64th minute. He made his league debut four days later in a 2–2 draw away to York City. He made his home league debut on 29 September, replacing Craig Westcarr in the 89th minute of a 1–1 draw against Torquay United. It was his final first-team appearance for the club.

Loan spells 
During his time at Chesterfield he had a number of loan spells in non-league football. He was sent on a month's loan to Matlock Town in December 2012, and to Workington in March 2013 for the remainder of the season. In June 2013 he joined Norwegian fourth-tier Sprint-Jeløy on loan for six months. He returned to England in late October, and was signed on a month's loan by Derbyshire club Buxton in January 2014. After making five appearances, he was loaned to Bradford Park Avenue until 8 March. His final loan, which included a 24-hour recall clause, was to FC United of Manchester for the remainder of the season.

Later career
On 13 May 2014, Chesterfield announced his release from the club. He moved on to Ashton United, before Mickleover Sports manager Glenn Kirkwood got his much-wanted signature in October 2014. After helping them gain promotion to the Northern Premier League, scoring 18 in 32 games, he moved to Frickley Athletic in August 2015 helping them to a 7th-place finished in a great season for the club.

On 15 May 2016, Hazel signed a one-year contract with National League North side Gainsborough Trinity. He made his debut for Farsley Celtic on 17 September 2016, after joining the club on a three-month loan deal. On 16 December 2016 he was signed by Scarborough Athletic.

He agreed terms with Frickley Athletic for a return to West Yorkshire in June 2017.

Hazel signed for Whitby Town at the start of the 2020–21 season. In his debut season, Hazel made nine league appearances and scored five times before the Northern Premier League season was ended early following the COVID-19 outbreak.

On 6 May 2022, Hazel joined National League North side Darlington on a two-year contract, for an undisclosed fee.

International career
He was on the bench for the Saint Kitts and Nevis national football team in the two 2018 FIFA World Cup qualification CONCACAF Second Round matches against El Salvador in June 2015. He made his debut for Saint Kitts and Nevis in a friendly 1–1 tie with Estonia on 20 November 2016.

Personal life
His father Des Hazel is a former footballer who played at professional levels for Sheffield Wednesday, Grimsby Town, Rotherham United and Chesterfield.

Career statistics

References

External links
Profile at the official Chesterfield website

1994 births
Living people
Saint Kitts and Nevis footballers
Saint Kitts and Nevis international footballers
English footballers
Association football forwards
Chesterfield F.C. players
Matlock Town F.C. players
Workington A.F.C. players
SK Sprint-Jeløy players
Buxton F.C. players
Bradford (Park Avenue) A.F.C. players
F.C. United of Manchester players
Ashton United F.C. players
Mickleover Sports F.C. players
Frickley Athletic F.C. players
Farsley Celtic F.C. players
Scarborough Athletic F.C. players
Gainsborough Trinity F.C. players
Whitby Town F.C. players
Darlington F.C. players
English Football League players
National League (English football) players
Northern Premier League players
Saint Kitts and Nevis expatriate footballers
Expatriate footballers in Norway
English expatriate footballers
English expatriate sportspeople in Norway
English sportspeople of Saint Kitts and Nevis descent
Citizens of Saint Kitts and Nevis through descent